Traditional Japanese musical instruments, known as  in Japanese, are musical instruments used in the traditional folk music of Japan. They comprise a range of string, wind, and percussion instruments.

Percussion instruments
; also spelled  – clapper made from wooden slats connected by a rope or cord
 – wooden or bamboo clappers
 – pellet drum, used as a children's toy
 – small, ornately decorated hourglass-shaped drum
 – hand-held bell tree with three tiers of pellet bells
 – small drum used in 
 – small flat gong
 – a pair of sticks which are beaten together slowly and rhythmically
 (also called ) – clapper made from a pair of flat wooden sticks
 – woodblock carved in the shape of a fish, struck with a wooden stick; often used in Buddhist chanting
 – hand drum
 or  – singing bowls used by Buddhist monks in religious practice or rituals
 – hourglass-shaped double-headed drum; struck only on one side
 – clapper made from wooden slats connected by a rope or cord
 – a lithophone either bowed or struck
 – small drum played with sticks
 – small bronze gong used in gagaku; struck with two horn beaters

 – drum on a stand with ornately painted head, played with a padded stick
 – small hand drum

String instruments

Plucked

Zithers 
 – monochord 
 – the 17-string koto
 – a long zither
 – ancient long zither; also called

Harps 
 – an angled harp used in ancient times and recently revived
 – a zither with metal strings and keys

Lutes 
 – a pear-shaped lute

Other 
 or 
 – an Okinawan precursor of the mainland Japanese (and Amami Islands) 
 – a banjo-like lute with three strings; brought to Japan from China in the 16th century. The strings, which are of different thickness, are plucked or struck with a tortoise shell, ivory or synthetic ivory pick.
 – a plucked instrument used by the Ainu people of Hokkaidō

Bowed 
 – a bowed lute with three (or, more rarely, four) strings and a skin-covered body

Wind instruments

Flutes
Japanese flutes are called . There are eight traditional flutes, as well as more modern creations.
 – vertical bamboo flute
 – transverse bamboo flute used for Noh theater
 – transverse bamboo flute used for 
 – vertical bamboo flute used for Zen meditation
 – transverse folk bamboo flute
 – globular flute made from clay

Reed instruments
 – double-reeded flute used in different kinds of music

Free reed mouth organs
 – 17-pipe mouth organ used for gagaku
 – large mouth organ

Horns
 – seashell horn; also called

Other instruments
 – jaw harp used by the Ainu people

See also
Music of Japan

Notes

References

Bibliography
 .

Japanese music-related lists
Instruments
Lists of musical instruments